Giotti Victoria–Savini Due is a Romanian UCI Continental cycling team established in 2018.
The main sponsor is Italian Giotti Victoria automotive.

Team roster

Major results
2018
Stage 2 Tour of Albania, Nicolas Marini
Stage 3 Tour of Bihor, Riccardo Stacchiotti
Stage 4 Grande Prémio de Portugal N2, Riccardo Stacchiotti
Stages 1 & 5 Volta a Portugal, Riccardo Stacchiotti
2019
Stage 1 Giro di Sicilia, Riccardo Stacchiotti
Points classification Tour of Japan, Federico Zurlo
Stage 5, Federico Zurlo
Stage 3 Tour de Kumano, Federico Zurlo
Stage 4 Sibiu Cycling Tour, Riccardo Stacchiotti
Prologue Cycling Tour of Szeklerland, Daniel Crista
2021 
Stages 1 & 3 Tour of Szeklerland, Andrea Guardini
Stage 4 Tour of Romania, Emil Dima

National Champions
2018
 Romania U23 Road Race, Emil Dima
2019
 Romania U23 Time Trial, Emil Dima
 Romania Road Race, Denis Marian Vulcan
2020
 Hungary Road Race, Viktor Filutás
2021
 Hungary Road Race, Viktor Filutás

References

External links

UCI Continental Teams (Europe)
Cycling teams based in Romania
Cycling teams established in 2018
2018 establishments in Romania